Asadabad-e Bala (also Romanized as Asadābād-e Bālā; also known as Asadābād, Asadābād-e ‘Olyā, and Asadābād Kuchik) is a village in Mehrabad Rural District, Bahman District, Abarkuh County, Yazd Province, Iran. At the 2006 census, its population was 81, in 23 families.

References 

Populated places in Abarkuh County